Scholastic Scrimmage is a high school quiz bowl game show, launched in 1975. It airs on WLVT-TV, the PBS affiliate for the Lehigh Valley  in eastern Pennsylvania.

The long-running show is hosted by writer and producer David Graf.  Prior to fall 1995, the show was hosted by Harry Price. Other hosts have included Karen Walton, vice president of academics at DeSales University (1995–2017), Joseph Pacitti, English teacher at Salisbury High School (2017–18), and author and Bethlehem Area Public Library director Josh Berk (2018–2019). 

Another version of the show is aired on WVIA-TV, currently hosted by Paul Lazar, in the Scranton media market. A third version aired on WPSU-TV (formerly WPSX-TV) in central Pennsylvania from 2003–2009 before being discontinued.

Two teams of four players from Pennsylvania high schools field questions on a diverse range of academic subjects and score points with correct answers. The winners of each game advance in a competitive, season-long tournament.

WLVT-TV 39 version

Game rules

The game is played in one round of 24 minutes with a half-time separating the round into two segments.  The game begins with a toss-up question. Any Player from either team can buzz in to answer the toss-up question, but the players may not confer with their team members.  Players must buzz in before time expires to answer the question. The first player to buzz in and give the correct answer earns 10 points and a chance at a related bonus question for their team. If a player answers incorrectly, his/her team loses 5 points from their score (scores can become negative) and his/her team can no longer buzz in for that question.  The question is then directed to the opposing team to buzz in (they may not confer).  If one of the opposing team members answers the rebounded toss-up correctly his/her team scores 5 points and a chance at a related bonus question.  If he or she answers incorrectly on the rebounded toss-up question, his/her team does not lose any points and the contest continues with another toss-up.  Similarly, if neither team buzzes in within the time limit, the contest continues with another toss-up.

After answering a toss-up or rebounded toss-up correctly, a team receives one or more bonus questions worth a total of up to 10 points.  The team members can confer on the answer, but only the captain can buzz in to answer.  Depending upon the number of bonus questions given and answered correctly, the team can receive 0, 5, or 10 bonus points.  

The team that has the highest score wins the match and advances to the next round of the tournament. The tournament bracket is made up of approximately 32 teams from high schools around the Lehigh Valley (the exact number varies from year to year).  At the end of the Scholastic Scrimmage season, the winning school is awarded $4000, with the runner-up receiving $2000. The winning team also receives small trophies, a large trophy for their high school's trophy case, and the bragging rights of being the best team in the Lehigh Valley.  The show is currently in its 45th year on WLVT-TV.

Records

In the 46-year history of Scholastic Scrimmage, Emmaus High School in Emmaus, Pennsylvania has the best record, with 8 first place and 4 second place finishes. 

Other notable performances are by Liberty High School with 4 first place and 5 second place finishes, Southern Lehigh High School with 4 first place and 3 second place finishes, Parkland High School with 5 first place and 3 second place finishes, and Moravian Academy with 3 first place and 6 second place finishes.

Past winners

WVIA-TV 44 version

Game rules

The game is played in one round of 20 minutes with a half-time separating the round into two segments.  Most of each half consists of toss-up/bonus questions.  Any Player from either team can buzz in to answer the toss-up question, but the players may not confer with their team members.  Players must buzz in before time expires to answer the question.  The first player to buzz in and give the correct answer earns 10 points and a chance at a related bonus question for their team.  If a player answers incorrectly, there is no point penalty, but his/her team can no longer buzz in for that question.  The question is then directed to the opposing team to buzz in (they may not confer).  If one of the opposing team members answers the rebounded toss-up correctly his/her team scores 10 points but no bonus question is asked.  If the player who buzzes in answers incorrectly on the rebounded toss-up question, his/her team does not lose any points and the contest continues. Similarly, if neither team buzzes in within the time limit, the contest continues.

When a bonus question is awarded, the team receives a bonus question worth 5 points. The team members can confer on the answer, but only the captain can answer (buzzing in is not required for a bonus question).

Two minutes of each half are "lightning" rounds. Each team has one minute to answer up to ten questions related to a single category, without interference from the other team.  Players must buzz in to answer these questions.  If a player is certain that nobody on the team is able to answer that question, that player may buzz in and answer "pass" to move on to the next question. Each correct answer is worth 10 points.

After half-time, play continues exactly as it had in the first segment until a buzzer sounds signaling that time has expired.  The team that has the highest score wins the match and advances to the next round of the tournament.

Tournament format

The tournament bracket is made up of divisions corresponding to the intermediate units in the WVIA-TV broadcast area.  In 2017-18 there were three divisions (Northeastern, Luzerne, Central Susquehanna), with a total of 44 high schools competing.  (The exact number of schools varies from year to year, and other intermediate units have sponsored divisions in previous seasons.)  Each division has its own single-elimination bracket, then the division winners compete against each other for the overall championship.  At the end of the Scholastic Scrimmage season, the winning school is awarded $5000, with the runner-up receiving $3000 and third place receiving $1000.  The winning team also receives medals, a plaque for their high school's trophy case, and bragging rights.  The spring of 2018 was the 13th year of the show on WVIA-TV.

WPSU-TV 3 version

Past winners

Past winners of the WPSU-TV version of Scholastic Scrimmage, which was discontinued in June 2009, were:

References

External links
 WLVT Scholastic Scrimmage website
 WVIA Scholastic Scrimmage website

1975 American television series debuts
Lehigh Valley
Student quiz television series